Johanna "Hanna" Schnarf (born 16 September 1984) is a World Cup  alpine ski racer from Italy.  She focuses on the speed events of super-G and downhill and also the combined.

Biography
Born in Brixen, South Tyrol, Schnarf made her World Cup debut at age 20 in December 2004. She competed for Italy at the 2010 Winter Olympics and 2018 Winter Olympics, and finished fourth in the super-G, missing the bronze medal by 0.11 seconds, and was eighth in the combined. Schnarf has also raced in five world championships, with two top tens in the combined.

World Cup results

Season standings

Race podiums
  
 2 podiums – (1 DH, 1 SG)

World Championship results

Olympic results

References

External links
 
  – 

1984 births
Living people
Italian female alpine skiers
Alpine skiers at the 2010 Winter Olympics
Alpine skiers at the 2018 Winter Olympics
Olympic alpine skiers of Italy
Germanophone Italian people
Sportspeople from Brixen
Alpine skiers of Fiamme Gialle